The Australian Defence Force Academy (ADFA) is a tri-service military Academy that provides military and  academic education for junior officers of the Australian Defence Force in the Royal Australian Navy (RAN), Australian Army and Royal Australian Air Force (RAAF). In 2016 the Academy began accepting civilian students in its  undergraduate courses.

Tertiary education is provided by the University of New South Wales' Canberra campus, known as UNSW Canberra at ADFA, which is the awarding body for ADFA qualifications. Apart from educating future leaders of the Australian Defence Force, UNSW Canberra also provides  postgraduate programs and short courses both to Department of Defence personnel and the general public.

The stated purpose of ADFA is "to serve Australia by providing the Australian Defence Force (ADF) with tertiary graduates who have the attributes, intellect and skills required of an officer".

ADFA is located in the suburb of Campbell, Canberra, Australian Capital Territory, near the Australian Government district of Russell. It is situated next to Mount Pleasant, which gives some parts of ADFA a view over the rest of Canberra. ADFA is also adjacent to the Australian Army military academy, the Royal Military College, Duntroon.

Junior officers who attend the Australian Defence Force Academy hold the rank of Midshipman (MIDN) in the Royal Australian Navy, Officer Cadet (OCDT) in the Australian Army or Officer Cadet (OFFCDT) in the Royal Australian Air Force.

History

Establishment
After World War II, each of the three Armed Services adopted, as policy, that the educational standards should be raised for officers in training.

In 1967 an agreement was reached between the Department of Defence and the University of New South Wales, under which they would co-operate to develop the Royal Military College (RMC) into a degree-level institution. To that end, the University established the Faculty of Military Studies at RMC to conduct courses leading to the award of the University's degrees in arts, science and engineering.

Also in 1967, the University of New South Wales entered into an association with the RAN College enabling it to present approved courses. Subsequently, first year courses for certain University programs in arts, science and engineering were introduced. Successful cadets were sponsored by the Navy to complete bachelor's degrees on the University's campus.

Concurrent with the developments at the RAN College and RMC, from 1967 to 1970, Sir Leslie H. Martin chaired the Commonwealth Government's Tertiary Education (Services' Cadet Colleges) Committee into the feasibility of setting up a college for the joint education of officer cadets of the three Armed Services.

Investigations on a wider scale followed with the result that in 1974 the Commonwealth Government announced its intention of establishing a single tertiary institution for the Defence Force. In 1977 the government formally established the Australian Defence Force Academy as a Joint Service Unit under Section 32c of the Defence Act 1903. The Chief of the Defence Force, Air Chief Marshal Sir Neville McNamara, simultaneously announced the appointment of Rear Admiral Peter Sinclair, Royal Australian Navy as the Commandant. Construction began on the site in 1981. In February 1984 the University of New South Wales announced the appointment of Professor G.V.H. Wilson as Rector of the University College. In September 1985 the Interim Academy Council ceased its functions and the Australian Defence Force Academy Council held its inaugural meeting under the Chairmanship of Sir Edward Woodward.

In 1986 ADFA opened and began providing military and tertiary academic education for Midshipmen and Officer Cadets. In late 2003 the Australian Department of Defence entered into another agreement with the University of New South Wales for the operation of University College at ADFA.

In 2015 a $98 million redevelopment was completed.

Criticism, review and reform of ADFA
Over its history ADFA has been criticised for its cost of operation and for instances of cadet misbehaviour – bastardisation. In 1998, the Director of the Defence Equity Organisation, Bronwen Grey, led a review into the policies and practices to deal with sexual harassment and sexual offences at ADFA. This review – commonly referred to as the Grey Review – led to fundamental structural and cultural changes at ADFA. These included the abolition of a cadet rank hierarchy and the introduction of improved training in equity and diversity for cadets and staff. Notwithstanding these improvements, the national publicity associated with the review caused considerable damage to the Academy's reputation.

In July 2006, LCDR Robyn Fahy – the first woman to graduate from ADFA and the dux of her year – was awarded an undisclosed amount in compensation for abuses suffered during her service in the ADF, including instances of physical and verbal abuse suffered at ADFA. ADFA attracted further criticism from the Canberra gay and lesbian community after its commandant issued an order preventing Academy personnel from frequenting the Cube nightclub – a gay and lesbian venue. The order was in response to then recent violence at the club, in which a patron was stabbed. The ban has since been lifted.

In April 2011, it was alleged a male cadet used Skype to stream video of consensual sex with a female cadet to several other cadets at ADFA. The allegation achieved national media attention, and is the subject of current civil charges in the ACT courts. Aside from this court action, the incident triggered several other inquiries, investigations and reviews into ADFA. These included an inquiry led by Mr Andrew Kirkham QC into ADFA's management of the incident, and a review led by Elizabeth Broderick Sex Discrimination Commissioner, into the treatment of women at ADFA. The Broderick Review found that ADFA was a greatly improved institution since the 1990s, and that the extreme cultural concerns identified by Bronwen Grey in 1998 were no longer apparent. Notwithstanding, the Broderick Review found there were still structural and cultural deficiencies at ADFA which contributed to widespread, low-level sexual harassment. This review has led to a second tranche of major reform at ADFA, which is still underway.

In November 2014 the Australian Government's Defence Abuse Response Taskforce recommended that a royal commission be conducted to consider all allegations of abuse at ADFA since its establishment in 1986.

Open day 
ADFA has a yearly open day with displays of military hardware, demonstrations and flypasts. Due to the COVID-19 pandemic in 2020 the physical open day was replaced by an on-line event. The 2021 open day is scheduled for 21 August.

Commandants
The following officers served as commandants of the academy:

Rear Admiral Peter Sinclair  (1984–1986)
Major General Peter Day  (1986–1990)
Air Vice Marshal Richard Bomball  (1990–1993)
Rear Admiral Anthony Carwardine  (1993–1995)
Major General Frank Hickling  (1995–1996)
Air Vice Marshal Gary Beck  (1996–1997)
Commodore Brian Adams  (1998–2000)
Air Commodore Julie Hammer  (2001–2003)
Commodore James Goldrick  (2003–2006)
Brigadier Brian Dawson  (2007)
Brigadier Wayne Goodman  (2008–2009)
Air Commodore Margaret Staib  (2009)
Commodore Bruce Kafer  (2009–2013)
Air Commodore Alan Clements  (2013–2016)
Brigadier Cheryl Pearce  (2017–2018)
Commodore Peter Leavy  (2019–2021)
Air Commodore Jules Adams (2022-[...])

Academic education

Awards
ADFA's academic education is run by the University of New South Wales, and it offers awards at the Diploma, Associate Diploma, Bachelor's Degree, Master's Degree, and Doctorate levels.

Under its agreement with the Department of Defence, the University of New South Wales (UNSW) provides Midshipmen (RAN) and Officer Cadets (ARA and RAAF) with a tertiary education at its University College campus (UNSW@ADFA), which is located on the Academy grounds.

Midshipmen, Officer Cadets and civilians undertake three- and four-year undergraduate degrees at ADFA. Currently, undergraduate degrees include:
 Bachelor of Arts
 Bachelor of Science
 Bachelor of Business
 Bachelor of Computing and Cyber Security
 Bachelor of Engineering with Honours (Aeronautical, Civil, Electrical, Mechanical and Naval Architecture)
 Bachelor of Technology (Aeronautical and Aviation)

However, those who do well academically and militarily have the possibility to return to ADFA for one year in order to do honours, as long as their respective services authorise further training. In addition to honours in Engineering, UNSW@ADFA offers honours in:
 Bachelor of Arts
 Bachelor of Business
 Bachelor of Science
 Bachelor of Information Technology

Post-graduate studies are provided to civilians, senior members of the ADF and senior public servants. Increasingly, distance-education units are being offered for service members not based in Canberra.

Entrance requirements
The UNSW and ADF have invested considerable effort in maintaining a high standard of academic performance. "83 per cent of the more than 600 students enrolled in the three-year course had tertiary entrance scores higher than 80 per cent, placing them among the nation's best academic performers".

Student performance
"ADFA's GTS – Good Teaching Scale – is 54, and nearly triple the Group of Eight median of 20.53. It's SPR – Student Progress Rate, which calculates the ratio of the load passed to total course load – is 93.7, compared with the Go8 median of 88. Its OSI – Overall Satisfaction Index – is 72, [compared to] the Go8 median of 39.1."

Military training

Year One Familiarisation Training (YOFT)
On arrival at ADFA, new Officer Cadets undertake a five-week phase of training known as Year One Familiarisation Training (YOFT). Midshipmen join the Officer Cadets approximately two weeks into this training, as they have already received some basic military training as part of their first year in the Navy. Year One Familiarisation Training encompasses weapon training, physical training, first aid, drill and academic enrollments. The training culminates with the return of second and third year cadets to ADFA, and the conduct of the Chief of the Defence Force (CDF) Parade in late February/early March.

Joint Military Education Training (JMET)
During academic sessions, ADFA provides basic military training to Midshipmen and Officer Cadets through the Joint Military Education Training (JMET) program. The JMET program encompasses physical training (PT), leadership and management studies, equity and diversity (E&D), military history, defence studies, drill and ceremonial, the military communication program (MCP), first aid, military law, field craft and weapons training.

Single Service Training (SST)
At the end of each academic session, Midshipmen and Officer Cadets move to their respective single service colleges for Single Service Training (SST). Such training prepares them to be officers in the ADF. Army Officer Cadets continue this training for another 12 months after leaving ADFA at the Royal Military College, Duntroon (RMC-D), to later be commissioned as Lieutenants. Most Officer Cadets and Midshipmen undertake six SST periods over a three-year period. However, Midshipmen have already completed 12 months of training in the Navy so they may not be required to train in these periods.

Academy life
The ADFA year is split by the two academic sessions, during which academic education is carried out. However, a variety of other activities take place in and around these sessions. Before Session 1, 'first years' undertake YOFT whilst second and third years are trained on their respective SST blocks. After Session 1, a two-week holiday period begins, though first years go on their first SST block. Academics recommence after this period with the start of Session 2. At the end of Session 2, all years commence their final SST block for the year, and shortly after this, third years graduate, and this is formally recognised during the 'Grad' parade.

At ADFA, officers and senior NCOs lead the daily lives of the cadets. Since a cadet chain of command is absent, a key opportunity to gain leadership experience is by captaining one of the varsity or club sports teams.

Timetable
ADFA runs on standard military time and generally follows the timetable:
 0700 to 0800 – Reveille and Breakfast
 0800 to 1000 – Joint Military Education or PT 
 1000 to 1800 – Academic classes (University timetable dependant)
 1800 to 1930 – Sports training (optional)

Sports
ADFA is well known within both the ADF and the Canberra local region for its sports programme. While not compulsory, it is strongly encouraged that each and every OCDT/OFFCDT and MIDN takes up at least one sport each year to develop their team, leadership and social skills. The sports available at ADFA include both ‘inter-range’ sports that are played against other civilian and ADF teams, and Academy sports that are just competed within the academy itself. Cadets are permitted to play one grade A sport and up to two grade B sports from the following non-exclusive list:

Grade A
 Association Football (Soccer – including a women's team)
 Australian Rules Football (including a women's team)
 Rugby League (competing in the New South Wales Tertiary Student Rugby League competition)
 Rugby Union (including a women's team)

Grade B

Voluntary extra-curricular clubs
"ADFA offers a range of sporting and voluntary extra-curricular clubs (VECCs) for cadets, encouraging them to compete against and become involved with local and interstate organisations."

VECCs currently offered at ADFA include:
Bands and Musical opportunities – The Australian Defence Force Academy Band (ADFA Band) is the official musical unit of the Australian Defence Force Academy. The band is composed of smaller ensembles (of which the pipe band and the marching band are the largest) who perform during ceremonies such as ANZAC Day and ADFA Graduation Day.
Community Service VECC (CSV)
ADFA Debating Society (ADS)
FOCUS (Fellowship of Christian University Students)
Military Shooting VECC (MSV)
Musical Production VECC (The ADFA Performing Arts Company)
Precision Drill Team – A platoon of ADFA with Lee Enfield Rifles. Since its establishment, the unit has performed at events such as the Brisbane Festival and the Sydney International Military Tattoo.
FSAE (Academy Racing – Formula SAE Car)
Web Design Group
Lawn Bowls
Martial Arts
Mountaineering
 Cross Fit
Fencing
Photography Club
CyberSec

Others not mentioned on the ADFA VECCs webpage include:
 Aviation Interest Group
 Maritime Interest Group
 ADFA 4X4 VECC
 DJ VECC
 ADFA Focus
 ADFA Anglers Fishing VECC

Facilities
Most facilities at ADFA were constructed in the early 1980s, including:
 Accommodation blocks, commonly known as 'divisions', or 'lines'.
 An Indoor Sports Centre, with pool (and overhead obstacle course), weights gym, cardio room, boxercise room, squash courts and a basketball court.
 Military and Academic lecture theatres.
 One of two cyber battle boards in Australia
 A Junior ranks mess, Senior NCOs mess, Officers mess and the Academy Cadets Mess (which is the largest military mess in the southern hemisphere).
 Sporting facilities, including a football oval, rugby field, tennis courts, volleyball courts, netball courts, soccer fields, cross-country course and a boat shed.
 ADFA also has access to a Weapons Training Simulation System.
 ADFA also has the lowest student to academic staff ratio of any university in Australia at 9:1

Structure

UNSW Canberra at ADFA

UNSW Canberra at ADFA is managed for UNSW by a Rector. Under the Rector are the heads of schools, who manage their respective schools.
UNSW Canberra at ADFA schools were restructured from twelve discipline-based schools to four multi-disciplinary Schools as of 1 January 2012. These are:
 School of Engineering and Information Technology
 School of Business
 School of Humanities and Social Sciences
 School of Physical, Environmental and Mathematical Sciences

ADFA
As of January 2001, ADFA has been part of the Australian Defence College (ADC) command structure, which is also responsible for the Australian Command and Staff College (ACSC) and the Centre for Defence and Strategic Studies (CDSS).

The Commandant of ADFA is appointed by the Australian Defence Force for a period of three years. Command of ADFA is based upon a three-year rotation between the three services and is held by a commodore, brigadier, or air commodore.

Temporary command arrangements in 2011
As a result of the 'Skype incident' in April 2011, the Commandant of ADFA – Commodore Bruce Kafer – was temporarily stood down from duty. A major inquiry into ADFA's management of the incident was undertaken by Andrew Kirkham QC, and during this period several officers filled the role of Acting Commandant; Colonel Paul Petersen, Group Captain 'Loch' Mitchell and Rear Admiral James Goldrick. The findings of the Kirkham Inquiry eventually cleared the way for Commodore Kafer to be reinstated as Commandant in March 2012.

Organisation
ADFA is based on an amalgamation of all three services, and the organisation of the cadet side of the academy reflects this. Divisions are accommodated in accommodation blocks (commonly known as 'lines' or 'divs') consisting of five sections (Alpha, Bravo, Charlie, Delta, Echo) with a sixth section (Foxtrot) normally reserved for divisional staff and storage. Each section has two corridors (Half-sections) with four rooms and shared toilet, bathroom and laundry facilities.

There are six squadrons, Alpha, Bravo, Charlie, Delta, Echo, and Foxtrot, with up to four divisions in each squadron. Each division has either first- and third-years or second- and third-years, and each squadron has all three-year levels. Annually, the squadrons compete against each other in a range of activities, including drill and ceremonial, cross country, athletics, swimming, fitness excellence challenge, tug-o-war, academic results and community service. The squadron who achieves the best results across all activities are awarded the Lancaster Shield, and become the CDF squadron for the following year. CDF squadron members receive minor benefits as recognition of their hard work and efforts in the previous year.

Advanced students (commissioned officers and 4th year engineering students) are part of Advanced Student divisions.  Advanced students may live in the Officers' Mess or off base. Prior to 2006 the years were arranged into separate squadrons, first year squadrons were tri service with cadets spending their final two years in single service squadrons. In 2010 this changed to the current system in order to increase cadet interyear interaction.

The Squadron chain of command is as follows:
Each division has a Divisional SNCO (Petty Officer/Sergeant) and Divisional Officer (Lieutenant RAN/Army Captain/RAAFFlight Lieutenant).
Each squadron has a Squadron Sergeant Major (SSM) (Chief Petty Officer/Warrant Officer Class 2 (WO2)/Flight Sergeant) and an Officer Commanding (OC) (Lieutenant Commander/Major/Squadron Leader).

Within each division a Midshipman/Officer Cadet is appointed as the Divisional Duty Officer (DDO) on a weekly or fortnightly basis. The DDO is responsible for the general administration of the division, its cleanliness, and conducting the division's movements to and from military commitments. In addition, each section has a section leader appointed who is responsible for the section duties and assists the DDO. Permanent positions (referred to as the Cadet Leadership Team) are also available for mainly third year Midshipman and Officer Cadets. There are 5 major yearly positions which are: Academy Cadet Captain, Academy Cadet Executive Officer, Chief of Staff,  President of the Mess Committee and Deputy President of the Mess Committee.

See also

Australian Defence College
Royal Australian Naval College
Officer Cadet School, Portsea
Officer Training Unit, Scheyville
Royal Military College, Duntroon

Other nations
Royal Military Academy Sandhurst
Royal Military College of Canada
United States Military Academy at West Point
United States Naval Academy at Annapolis
United States Air Force Academy
Indonesian Army Command and General Staff College
Staff college

References

Citations

Sources

 The regulars update, Issue 184, February 2004.

External links

 ADFA
 ADFA Graduates Association

Educational institutions established in 1986
Buildings of the Australian government
Faculties of the University of New South Wales
Military academies
Military education and training in Australia
Military installations in the Australian Capital Territory
Military units and formations of Australia
Universities in the Australian Capital Territory
University of New South Wales
1986 establishments in Australia